is the 7th single from Japanese idol group Keyakizaka46. It was released on August 15, 2018 under Sony Music Records. The title track features Yurina Hirate as center.

Manaka Shida, Aoi Harada, and Yūka Kageyama were on hiatus during production. Yui Imaizumi announced graduation shortly before and did not participate, but sang a solo song, "Hi ga Noburu Made", which was included on the regular edition.

Track listing

Type A

Type B

Type C

Type D

Regular edition

Participating members

"Ambivalent" 
Center: Yurina Hirate

 1st row: Mizuho Habu, Miyu Suzumoto, Yurina Hirate, Risa Watanabe, Yui Kobayashi
 2nd row: Rina Uemura, Yūka Sugai, Neru Nagahama, Minami Koike, Nanako Nagasawa
 3rd row: Nana Oda, Fuyuka Saitō, Akane Moriya, Rika Watanabe, Rika Ozeki, Nanami Yonetani, Nijika Ishimori, Shiori Sato

"Student Dance" 

Nijika Ishimori, Rina Uemura, Rika Ozeka, Nana Oda, Minami Koike, Yui Kobayashi, Fuyuka Saitō, Shiori Sato, Yūka Sugai, Miyu Suzumoto, Nanako Nagasawa, Neru Nagahama, Mizuho Habu, Yurina Hirate, Akane Moriya, Nanami Yonetani, Rika Watanabe, Risa Watanabe

"I'm out" 

Nijika Ishimori, Rina Uemura, Rika Ozeka, Nana Oda, Minami Koike, Yui Kobayashi, Fuyuka Saitō, Shiori Sato, Yūka Sugai, Miyu Suzumoto, Nanako Nagasawa, Neru Nagahama, Mizuho Habu, Yurina Hirate, Akane Moriya, Nanami Yonetani, Rika Watanabe, Risa Watanabe

"Happy Aura" 
Center: Shiho Katō

 Hiragana Keyakizaka46 1st Generation: Mao Iguchi, Sarina Ushio, Memi Kakizaki, Shiho Katō, Kyōko Saitō, Kumi Sasaki, Mirei Sasaki, Mana Takase, Ayaka Takamoto, Mei Higashimura
 Hiragana Keyakizaka46 2nd Generation: Miku Kanemura, Hina Kawata, Nao Kosaka, Suzuka Tomita, Akari Nibu, Hiyori Hamagishi, Konoka Matsuda, Manamo Miyata, Miho Watanabe

"302-Goshitsu" 

Yui Kobayashi, Mizuho Habu

"Ongaku Shitsu ni Kataomoi" 

Rika Ozeki, Minami Koike, Neru Nagahama

"Hi ga Noburu Made" 

Yui Imaizumi

Charts

Weekly charts

Year-end charts

References

Further reading

External links 
 Discography on the official website of Keyakizaka46
 

2018 singles
Keyakizaka46 songs
2018 songs
Songs with lyrics by Yasushi Akimoto
Sony Music Entertainment Japan singles
Oricon Weekly number-one singles
Billboard Japan Hot 100 number-one singles